The 2003 College Nationals was the 8th Men's and Women's College Nationals.  The College Nationals was a team handball tournament to determined the College National Champion from 2003 from the US.

Final ranking
Source:

Men's ranking

Women's ranking

References

External links
 Tournament Results archived

USA Team Handball College Nationals by year
Furman Paladins